Swartswood Lake (previously called Swartout's Pond) is a freshwater lake located in Stillwater and Hampton townships in Sussex County, New Jersey in the United States. The lake is a  glacial lake that is the third-largest freshwater lake in New Jersey. The lake is the focus of Swartswood State Park a  protected area administered by the New Jersey Division of Parks and Forestry.

Swartswood Lake is fed by the waters of Neldon's Brook (draining several lakes and Bear Swamp in Stillwater, Hampton, and Frankford townships; and by Indian Creek (or River) which empties Little Swartswood Lake to the north. The southern end of the lake was dammed by Charles Rhodes, Sr., in 1790 forming a mill pond in the narrow ravine at the lake's outlet, Keen's Mill Brook. The Brook flows into the Trout Brook near Middleville in Stillwater Township, a tributary of the Paulins Kill.

External links

 Swartswood State Park
 Swartswood Lakes and Watershed Association

Lakes of Sussex County, New Jersey
Lakes of New Jersey
Stillwater Township, New Jersey
Hampton Township, New Jersey
Paulins Kill watershed